Cleobury Mortimer railway station was a station in Cleobury Mortimer, Shropshire, England. The station was opened in 1864 and closed in 1962. Station buildings are still standing although they have been split into housing. The platforms exist in the undergrowth with a steel yard build to the west.

References

Further reading

Disused railway stations in Shropshire
Railway stations in Great Britain opened in 1864
Railway stations in Great Britain closed in 1962
Former Great Western Railway stations